Parmenomorpha is a genus of longhorn beetles of the subfamily Lamiinae, containing the following species:

 Parmenomorpha irregularis Blackburn, 1899
 Parmenomorpha medioplagiata Breuning, 1950
 Parmenomorpha wasselli Carter, 1932

References

Dorcadiini